Jan van der Merwe (born 16 March 1983) is a South African sprinter.

External links
 

1983 births
Living people
South African male sprinters
Athletes (track and field) at the 2006 Commonwealth Games
Commonwealth Games silver medallists for South Africa
Commonwealth Games medallists in athletics
World Athletics Championships athletes for South Africa
20th-century South African people
21st-century South African people
Medallists at the 2006 Commonwealth Games